Marília Soares Pêra (22 January 1943 – 5 December 2015) was a Brazilian actress, singer, and stage director. Hailed as "one of the decade's [1980s] ten best actresses" by Pauline Kael, Pêra won the National Society of Film Critics Award for Best Actress in 1982 for her role in Hector Babenco's acclaimed Pixote, and received Best Actress awards at the Gramado Film Festival (Triple Award Winner) and at the Cartagena Film Festival for Carlos Diegues' Better Days Ahead. Other films include Bar Esperança, Angels of the Night, and Diegues' Tieta do Agreste.

Biography
Marília Soares Pêra (Marilia Pera da Graça Mello, after she married), was born on January 22, 1943, in the neighborhood of Rio Comprido, in Rio de Janeiro.

From 14 to 21 years, works as a dancer in musicals and revue as Minha Querida Lady (1962), starring Bibi Ferreira, and O Teu Cabelo Não Nega (1963)  biography of Lamartine Babo, as Carmen Miranda - role that would repeat a few times in her career. Her father Manoel Pear enrolled her in a classical ballet school and took her to the television, to dance. Perâ participated in programs such as Espetáculos Tonelux, Grande Teatro Tupi, Grande Teatro da Imperatriz das Sedas, Teatrinho Troll and Câmera Um. In 1959, she left school to marry the actor Paulo Graça Mello. At 18, in 1961, she toured Brazil and Portugal with the play Henry Pongetti's Society em Baby-Doll. A year later, starred in the musical Como Vencer na Vida sem Fazer Força alongside Procópio Ferreira, Moacyr Franco and Berta Loran.

Career in television 
In 1965, Pêra was hired by director Abdon Torres to join the cast that would usher in the Rede Globo, and starred in the telenovelas Rosinha do Sobrado and Padre Tião, both written by Moses Weltman. Also acted in A Moreninha, an adaptation of novel's Joaquim Manuel de Macedo written by Graça Mello, who was director of the station. Pêra also participated in the cast of Beto Rockfeller (1968), written by Bráulio Pedroso, on TV Tupi, the soap opera is considered a landmark of Brazilian television, for his modern language and urban ambiance. Pêra was invited by director Daniel Filho to return to the Globo in 1971, to interpret Shirley Sexy in O Cafona, character that gave him great popularity. Soon after, she played the taxi driver Noeli in Bandeira 2, written by Dias Gomes. The following year, she it was Serafina Rosa Petrone in Uma Rosa com Amors Vicente Sesso, opposite Paul Goulart. Then she played the main character of the novel Supermanoela (1974), written by Walther Negrão.

In 1982, Pear played the character Alice in Quem Ama não Mata, written by Euclydes Marinho. The miniseries caused strong impact because of the realistic direction of Daniel Filho, and interpretations of the actress and Cláudio Marzo, and the approach of a controversial issue, the crime of passion. After 13 years, Pear returned to work in telenovelas on TV Globo, as Rafaela Alvaray in Brega & Chique, soap opera displayed in 1987, written by Cassiano Gabus Mendes. In the miniseries O Primo Basílio (1988), an adaptation of Gilberto Braga and Leonor Brassères of Eça de Queiroz's novel, Pêra played the villain Juliana, another remarkable character.

Pêra worked on two telenovelas by Ricardo Linhares: Lua Cheia de Amor (1991), co-written by Ana Maria Moretzsohn and Maria Carmen Barbosa, and Meu Bem Querer (1998). In Band, starred in O Campeão (1982), another novel Linhares, and the headline in Mandacaru (1997), written by Carlos Alberto Ratton. In 2001, Pêra participated of the cast in the miniseries Os Maias, an adaptation Eça de Queiroz's novel.

The actress was part of casts of the telenovelas Começar de Novo in 2004; Cobras & Lagartos, in 2006; Duas Caras in 2007. Her last work at the broadcaster was the TV show Pé na Cova [One foot in the grave, in an unofficial translation], aired since 2013.

Film career 
Internationally, Marília Pêra is best known for her performance in  Pixote: A Lei do Mais Fraco (1980), where she portrayed the character Sueli. In 1982 she became the first South American ever honored in North America with a Best Actress Prize awarded by the National Society of Film Critics Awards. The film itself was nominated for the Best Foreign Film Golden Globe, but lost to that year's eventual Best Picture Oscar winner, Hugh Hudson's Chariots of Fire.  Vincent Canby wrote for The New York Times in relation to the film: “The performances are almost too good to be true, but Mr. Da Silva and Miss Pera are splendid.” A former street kid, Fernando Ramos da Silva returned to the streets a few years after Pixote was released. He was killed by police – following an alleged shootout – at age 19 on Aug. 25, 1987.
 
Highlights of her movie career include Hugo Carvana's Bar Esperança (1983), in a comic performance as a temperamental soap opera star. Other films include: Central do Brasil (1998) and Jogo de Cena (2007). Her last film work was in Polaroides Urbanas in 2008.

Death 
Pêra died at her apartment in Rio de Janeiro from lung cancer at the age of 72.

Awards

Filmography

Movies

1968: O Homem Que Comprou o Mundo .... Rosinha
1970: O Donzelo
1970: É Simonal
1975: O Rei da Noite .... Pupe
1975: Ana, a Libertina
1978: O Grande Desbum...
1981: Pixote: A Lei do Mais Fraco .... Sueli
1983: Bar Esperança .... Ana
1984: Mixed Blood .... Rita La Punta
1984: Plunct, Plact, Zuuum II (TV Movie) .... Fabiano's mother
1987: Anjos da Noite .... Marta Brum
1990: Dias Melhores Virão .... Maryalva 'Mary' Matos
1995: Jenipapo .... Renata
1996: Tieta do Agreste .... Perpétua
1998: Central do Brasil .... Irene
1998: O Viajante .... Ana Lara
2001: Amélia .... Amélia
2002: Seja o Que Deus Quiser .... Dona Fernanda
2003: Garrincha - Estrela Solitária .... Vanderléia
2006: Acredite, um Espírito Baixou em Mim .... D. Graça
2006: Living the Dream .... Vanessa
2006: Vestido de Noiva .... Madame Clessy
2008: Polaróides Urbanas .... Magda / Magali
2008: Nossa Vida Não Cabe Num Opala .... Mãe de Monk, Lupa, Slide e Magali
2008: Xuxa e as Noviças (TV Movie) .... Irmã Gardênia
2009: Embarque Imediato .... Justina / Gilda
2016: Tô Ryca! .... Madame Claude (final film role)

Telenovelas

1965: Rosinha do Sobrado .... Rosinha
1965: A Moreninha .... Carolina
1965: Padre Tião
1966: Um Rosto de Mulher
1968: Beto Rockfeller .... Manoela
1968: O Homem Que Comprou o Mundo .... Rosinha
1969-1970: Super Plá .... Joana Martini
1971: O Cafona .... Shirley Sexy
1971-1972: Bandeira 2 .... Noeli
1972-1973: Uma Rosa Com Amor .... Serafina Rosa Petrone
1974: Supermanoela .... Manoela
1975: O Rei da Noite .... Pupe
1976: Planeta dos Homens
1987: Brega & Chique .... Rafaela Alvaray
1989: Top Model .... Maryalva 'Mary' Matos
1990-1991: Lua Cheia de Amor .... Genuína 'Genu' Miranda
1996: O Campeão .... Elizabeth Caldeira
1997: Mandacaru .... Isadora
1998-1999: Meu Bem-Querer .... Custódia Alves Serrão
2000: Brava Gente .... Amélia
2004-2005: Começar de Novo .... Janis Doidona
2006: Cobras & Lagartos .... Milu Montini
2007-2008: Duas Caras .... Gioconda
2011-2012: Aquele Beijo .... Maruschka Lemos de Sá

Series and Mini-Series 
1982: Quem Ama Não Mata .... Alice
1988: O Primo Basílio .... Juliana Couceiro Tavira
1994: Incidente em Antares .... Erotildes
2001: Os Maias .... Maria Monforte
2006: JK .... Sara Kubitschek
2007: Toma Lá, Dá Cá .... Ivone
2008: Casos e Acasos .... Sônia
2010: A Vida Alheia .... Catarina Faissol
2012: Louco Por Elas .... Madame Vivi
2013–2016: Pé na Cova .... Darlene

References

External links

 

1943 births
2015 deaths
Brazilian film actresses
Brazilian stage actresses
Brazilian telenovela actresses
Brazilian people of Italian descent
Brazilian people of Portuguese descent
Actresses from Rio de Janeiro (city)
Deaths from lung cancer
Deaths from cancer in Rio de Janeiro (state)
20th-century Brazilian actresses
21st-century Brazilian actresses